Conal Nicholson "Nick" Hendry (1887 – 9 April 1949) was an English footballer who played as a goalkeeper.

Career
Hendry started his career with North Eastern Railway United, with whom he won the York and District League in the 1905–06 season. He joined Middlesbrough as an amateur in 1907, but failed to make any appearances in the league for the team. He then moved to Darlington in 1908, where he played until joining Hull City in March 1910. Here, he became one of the first York-born footballers to play in the Football League and was dubbed "the human octopus" because of his displays for the club.

He made 140 league appearances for Hull, 98 of which were consecutive. He made 271 appearances in first-team and war football for Hull, leaving the club in 1920, after which he spent a season with Doncaster Rovers. He joined York City in July 1922 for their first season in the Midland League and advised the club on team selection. He left the club in 1924 after making 56 appearances in the Midland League for York and later became a trainer at LNER Permanent Way.

References

1887 births
1949 deaths
Footballers from York
English footballers
Association football goalkeepers
Middlesbrough F.C. players
Darlington F.C. players
Hull City A.F.C. players
Doncaster Rovers F.C. players
York City F.C. players
English Football League players
Midland Football League players